Jack Higgins (birth unknown) is a former professional rugby league footballer who played in the 1940s. He played at club level for Featherstone Rovers (Heritage № 195), as an occasional goal-kicking , i.e. number 7.

Playing career
Higgins made his début for Featherstone Rovers on Monday 21 April 1941, he appears to have scored no drop-goals (or field-goals as they are currently known in Australasia), but prior to the 1974–75 season all goals, whether; conversions, penalties, or drop-goals, scored 2-points, consequently prior to this date drop-goals were often not explicitly documented, therefore '0' drop-goals may indicate drop-goals not recorded, rather than no drop-goals scored. In addition, prior to the 1949–50 season, the archaic field-goal was also still a valid means of scoring points.

Testimonial match
Higgins's benefit season at Featherstone Rovers, following a serious injury that forced his retirement, took place during the 1946–47 season.

References

External links

Search for "Higgins" at rugbyleagueproject.org
Testimonials and Benefit Seasons.
Walter Tennant, Alan Tennant ...
June 2013
Harold Moxon

English rugby league players
Featherstone Rovers players
Place of birth missing
Possibly living people
Rugby league halfbacks
Year of birth missing